This is a list of music related events in 1768.

Events 
Johann Christian Bach gives the first ever solo piano performance, in London on an instrument by Johannes Zumpe.
Wolfgang Amadeus Mozart and his family are resident in Vienna until December.
Antonio Sacchini returns to Venice to become director of the Conservatorio dell'Ospadeletto.
Giuseppe Tartini suffers a stroke.
Michael Haydn marries Maria Magdalena Lipp, a singer and the daughter of the court organist.

Popular music 
"The Liberty Song", with words by John Dickinson – considered the first American patriotic song.  He used the music to the traditional British song, Hearts of Oak.

Opera 

Johann Adolf Hasse – Piramo e Tisbe
Joseph Haydn – Lo speziale
Niccolò Jommelli 
Fetonte
La schiava liberata
 Wolfgang Amadeus Mozart 
Bastien und Bastienne, K. 50/46b (his first published opera)
La finta semplice, K.51/46a
Giovanni Paisiello – Olimpia
Antonio Zingarelli – I quattro pazzi

Classical music 
Mario*
Luigi Boccherini 
Cello Concerto in D Major
Cello Sonata in C major, G.6
6 Violin Sonatas, G.25-30, Op. 5
Muzio Clementi – Sonata for Harpsichord in G major
John Garth – 
Pietro Alessandro Guglielmi – 6 Harpsichord Quartets, Op. 1
Joseph Haydn 
Applausus
6 String Trios, Op. 5
Symphony No.49 in F minor, Hob.I:49 "La passione", "Il quakuo di bel'humore"
 Michael Haydn – Missa sancti Francisci Seraphici, MH 119
Wolfgang Amadeus Mozart – Symphonies No. 7 and No. 8
Friedrich Schwindl – 6 Trio Sonatas, Op. 5

Methods and theory writings 

 William Hayes – Anecdotes of the 5 Music-Meetings
 Johann Caspar Heck – A Complete System of Harmony
Gabriele Leone Méthode raisonnée pour passer du Violon à la Mandoline (Rational method for migrating from the violin to the mandolin)
Jean-Jacques Rousseau – Dictionnaire de musique
 Francisco Inácio Solano – Nova arte, e breve compendio de musica

Births 
January 16 – Carl Andreas Göpfert, German composer (died 1818)
March 12 – Carolus Antonius Fodor, composer
April 7 – Karl Theodor Toeschi, composer
July 6 – Johann Georg Heinrich Backofen, composer and clarinetist (died 1830)
September 1 – Carl Bernhard Wessely, composer
September 12 – Benjamin Carr, composer
September 14 – Georg Johann Schinn, composer
September 21 – Louis-Emmanuel Jadin, composer, pianist and harpsichordist (c. 1863)
November 24 – Jean-Engelbert Pauwels, composer
December 6 – Johann Baptist Henneberg, composer
date unknown 
Gaetano Crivelli, operatic tenor (d. 1836) 
Margarethe Danzi, collaborator and composer (died 1800)

Deaths 
January 1 – Jean-Laurent Krafft, composer
January 28 – John Wainwright, composer
March 3 – Nicola Porpora, composer
March 14 – Vigilio Blasio Faitello, composer
July 6 – Johann Conrad Beissel, composer
July 11 – José Melchior de Nebra Blascu, composer
August 21 (buried) – William Walond, English composer (born 1719)
October 28 – Michel Blavet, flautist and composer
October 31 – Francesco Maria Veracini, violinist and composer
November 1 – Pierre van Maldere, composer
probable – Domenico Gallo, composer and musician (born 1730)

References

 
18th century in music
Music by year